Israel Orenstein (19 May 1831 – 1905) was a Ukrainian-born Jewish novelist.

He was born in the Polodian town of Yampol, Podolian Governorate. At the age of twenty-one he went to Romania, where he published (1870) his first novel in Hebrew, Bet Ya'akov; o, dim'at 'ashukim. He subsequently published the Yiddish novels Arbe aves nezikin, Dos shlekhte kind, Eyts ha-daas, Khizoyen yisroel; oder, khibet hakeyver, Di geheymnisse der Yassyer gemeynde, and Di genarte velt.

Bibliography

References
 

1831 births
1905 deaths
People from Vinnytsia Oblast
People from Yampolsky Uyezd
Ukrainian Jews
Jews from the Russian Empire
Novelists from the Russian Empire
Male writers from the Russian Empire
Yiddish-language writers
Hebrew-language writers
Ukrainian novelists
Ukrainian male writers